Grant Robison (born September 27, 1978) is a retired track athlete, who competed in the middle distance running events. He represented the United States at the 2004 Summer Olympics. Robison won the bronze medal in the men's 1,500 metres at the 2003 Pan American Games. During college he ran for Stanford University.

Running career

High school
Robison attended and ran at McMinnville High School, where he graduated in 1996. He left McMinnville as the all-time school record-holder for the 1500 metres and 3000 metres disciplines, having personal bests of 3:56.06 and 8:32.79, respectively.

Collegiate
Robison ran for Stanford University, a school with a prestigious track program. After running for the school's cross country team as a freshman in 2000, he went on a two-year Mormon mission. Robison made a return to collegiate track in 2002, and won the 1500-metre at the 2003 NCAA Div I Outdoor Track Championships with a time of 3:40.39.

Post-collegiate
Robison qualified for the 2004 Summer Olympics by satisfying the Olympic A norm, allowing him to go to the Olympics in spite of not finishing in the Olympic berths at the 2004 US Olympic Trials. In the men's 1500-meter race at the 2004 Summer Olympics, Robison did not qualify past the first round, finishing in 11th out of 14 athletes in his heat.

References

External links
 

1978 births
Living people
People from Mountain View, California
Track and field athletes from California
American male middle-distance runners
Athletes (track and field) at the 2003 Pan American Games
Olympic track and field athletes of the United States
Athletes (track and field) at the 2004 Summer Olympics
Stanford Cardinal men's track and field athletes
Pan American Games bronze medalists for the United States
Pan American Games medalists in athletics (track and field)
Medalists at the 2003 Pan American Games